The 2013–14 Pacific Tigers men's basketball team represented the University of the Pacific during the 2013–14 NCAA Division I men's basketball season. They play their home games at the Alex G. Spanos Center. This was season of new beginnings for the Tigers. Gone after 25 seasons was long-time head coach Bob Thomason. The new head coach of the Tigers was former assistant Ron Verlin. Verlin arrived with much experience. Verlin had been the associate head coach for the Tigers for 19 seasons under Thomason. Verlin becomes the 20th head coach in the history of Tiger basketball.

In addition to the new coach, Pacific joined a new conference, the West Coast Conference. Pacific was one of the founders of what became the WCC. Now, after four decades, the Tigers returned allowing the WCC to return to a travel partner scenario. Pacific and Saint Mary's became travel partners. The other four sets of travel partners were San Francisco and Santa Clara, Loyola Marymount and Pepperdine, Gonzaga and Portland, and BYU and San Diego.

The Tigers finished the season 18–16, 6–12 in WCC play to finish in a tie for eighth place. They lost in the first round of the WCC tournament to Santa Clara. They were invited to the CollegeInsider.com Tournament where they defeated Grand Canyon, Texas A&M Corpus–Christi and fellow WCC member San Diego to advance to the semifinals where they lost to Murray State.

Before the season

Departures

In addition to the 7 listed, Andrew Bock and Trevin Harris also graduated. However they both have one year of eligibility remaining and will return to the team for the 2013-14 season.

Recruiting
Currently two players have committed to join the Tigers for the 2013-14 season. More are expected to be announced, probably from the Junior College ranks.

Roster

Schedule
Pacific basketball will see an increased amount of television exposure for the 2013-14 season. Every conference game is guaranteed to be on an ESPN Network, WCC TV, WCC Network, or a local TV station (Comcast, ROOT, Time Warner, FSSD, or BYUtv). Untelevised non-conference home games will likely be switch from Big West TV to Stretch Internet.

|-
!colspan=8 style="background:#FF7F00; color:#000000;"|Exhibition

|-
!colspan=8 style="background:#000000; color:#FF7F00;"| Regular season

|-
!colspan=8 style="background:#FF7F00;"| WCC tournament

|-
!colspan=8 style="background:#000000; color:#FF7F00;"| CIT

Game summaries

Exhibition: Cal State Stanislaus
Broadcaster: Zach Bayrouty

Exhibition: Montana Tech
Broadcaster: Zach Bayrouty

Nevada
Series History: Pacific leads 53-44
Broadcaster: Ryan Radtke

UC Irvine
Series History: Pacific leads 42-37
Broadcaster: Zach Bayrouty

Western Illinois
Series History: Pacific leads 1-0
Broadcaster: Zach Bayrouty

Fresno State
Series History: Pacific leads 78-77
Broadcaster: Zach Bayrouty

Global Sports Classic: Oregon
Series History: Oregon leads 6-2
Broadcasters: Aaron Goldsmith and Ernie Kent

Global Sports Classic: Cal Poly
Series History: Pacific leads 34-14

Global Sports Classic: North Dakota
Series History: Series tied 1-1

Utah State
Series History: Utah State leads 44-23
Broadcasters: Evan Nyman and Rod Tueller

Menlo College

South Point Holiday Classic: Princeton
Series History: First Meeting

South Point Holiday Classic: Bradley
Series History: Bradley leads 1-0

Saint Mary's
Series History: Saint Mary's leads 66-43
Broadcasters: Barry Tompkins and Dan Belluomini

Portland
Series History: Pacific leads 20-8
Broadcasters: Tom Glasgow & Bill Krueger

Gonzaga
Series History: Gonzaga leads series 3-1
Broadcasters: Greg Hesiter and Richard Fox

San Francisco
Series History: San Francisco leads 60-34
Broadcasters: Rich Cellini & John Stege

Santa Clara
Series History: Santa Clara leads 89-41
Broadcasters: Barry Tompkins and Jarron Collins

References

Pacific Tigers men's basketball seasons
Pacific
Pacific